The 2018 Birmingham City Council election is one of many local elections that took place in England on 3 May 2018. This was the first 'all-out' election for Birmingham City Council following a boundary review, which reduced the number of councillors from 120 to 101, serving 69 wards (previously 40 wards). Since the election, the city council has been composed of 37 single-member wards and 32 two-member wards.

Eligibility to vote 
All registered electors (British, Irish, Commonwealth and European Union citizens) who are aged 18 or over on polling day will be entitled to vote in the local elections. A person who has two homes (such as a university student having a term-time address and living at home during holidays) can register to vote at both addresses as long as they are not in the same electoral area, and can vote in the local elections for the two different local councils.

Election Results

Overall election result

Overall result compared with 2016.

Council Composition

Prior to the election

Prior to the 2018 election, Birmingham City Council was composed of 120 councillors across 40 wards. The council has been controlled by the Labour Party since 2012, which held two-thirds (80) of the seats. The Conservative Party last held sole control of the council in 1984. It was under no overall control from 2003 until 2012, run by a Labour-Liberal Democrat coalition from 2003 to 2004 and by a Conservative-Liberal Democrat coalition from 2004 to 2012.

Ward results

City centre and surrounding area

Aston

Birchfield

Bordesley & Highgate

Bordesley Green

Edgbaston

Handsworth

Handsworth Wood

Harborne

Holyhead

Ladywood

Lozells

Nechells

Newtown

North Edgbaston

Quinton

Soho & Jewellery Quarter

East of city centre

Alum Rock

Bromford & Hodge Hill

Garretts Green

Glebe Farm & Tile Cross

Heartlands

Shard End

Sheldon

Small Heath

South Yardley

Ward End

Yardley East

Yardley West & Stechford

North of city centre

Castle Vale

Erdington

Gravelly Hill

Kingstanding

Oscott

Perry Barr

Perry Common

Pype Hayes

Stockland Green

South-east of city centre

Acocks Green

Balsall Heath West

Brandwood & King's Heath

Druids Heath and Monyhull

Hall Green North

Hall Green South

Highter's Heath

Moseley

Sparkbrook & Balsall Heath East

Sparkhill

Tyseley & Hay Mills

South-west of city centre

Allens Cross

Bartley Green

Billesley

Bournbrook & Selly Park

Bournville & Cotteridge

Frankley Great Park

King's Norton North

King's Norton South

Longbridge & West Heath

Northfield

Rubery & Rednal

Stirchley

Weoley & Selly Oak

Sutton Coldfield

Sutton Four Oaks

Sutton Mere Green

Sutton Reddicap

Sutton Roughley

Sutton Trinity

Sutton Vesey

Sutton Walmley & Minworth

Sutton Wylde Green

By-elections

Billesley

Hall Green North

Oscott

Quinton

Yardley East

Notes

References

2018 English local elections
2018
2010s in Birmingham, West Midlands